Hesar-e Pain (also Romanized as Ḩeşār-e Pā’īn, Ḩeşar Pā’īn, and Hisār Pāīn; also known as Ḩeşār-e Pā’īn va Qūrdlū) is a village in Tarrud Rural District, in the Central District of Damavand County, Tehran Province, Iran. At the 2006 census, its population was 421, in 109 families.

References 

Populated places in Damavand County